Ian McCaskill (born John Robertson McCaskill; 28 July 1938 – 10 December 2016) was a BBC weather forecaster.

Early life
McCaskill attended Queen's Park Secondary in Glasgow, and then the University of Glasgow, where he studied geology and chemistry.

Career
McCaskill joined the RAF in 1959 as part of his National Service and became an airman meteorologist, first in Scotland and then in Cyprus. He once joked that when he joined the RAF he was given a choice between Catering and Meteorology, he did not know what meteorology was but he knew he could not cook. He left the RAF in 1961 and joined the Met Office, working at Glasgow Prestwick Airport, Malta and Manchester.

In 1978, McCaskill began working at the BBC Weather Centre, and presented the weather forecast for the BBC on both television and radio. He retired on 31 July 1998.

McCaskill was known for his soft-spoken demeanor, and his presentation style was widely imitated, including by the satirical comedy show Spitting Image and by impersonator Rory Bremner.  He was one of the weathermen mentioned on the novelty song "John Kettley Is a Weatherman".

McCaskill worked as a motivational speaker, and appeared on the BBC Television shows MasterChef and on Have I Got News for You, as well as in a number of TV advertisements. He also participated in the first series of Celebrity Fit Club in 2002.

In 2006, he co-wrote the book Frozen in Time, about Britain's worst ever winters, with Paul Hudson.

Personal life and death
McCaskill lived at Seer Green, near Beaconsfield in Buckinghamshire. He had two daughters with his first wife Lesley Charlesworth, to whom he was married from 1959 until her death from breast cancer in 1992. In 1998, he married Pat Cromack, becoming stepfather to her two sons.

McCaskill was a fellow of the Royal Meteorological Society. In May 2000, he opened the first phase of the £1.2 million  Lower Leas Coastal Park in Folkestone.

McCaskill was diagnosed with dementia in 2011 and died, near his home in Beaconsfield, on 10 December 2016, aged 78.

Books

References

1938 births
2016 deaths
People educated at Queen's Park Secondary School
Alumni of the University of Glasgow
BBC weather forecasters
Deaths from dementia in the United Kingdom
Mass media people from Glasgow
Place of death missing
Royal Air Force airmen
Scottish meteorologists
Scottish television presenters